Harry Field may refer to:
Harry Field (rugby league) (before 1910–after 1972), English prop or hooker during 1920s and 1930s
Harry Field (American football) (1911–1964), American offensive tackle during 1930s

See also
Harry & David Field, American baseball park in Medford, Oregon
Henry Field (disambiguation)